Megachile troodica is a species of bee in the family Megachilidae. It was described by Mavromoustakis in 1953.

References

Troodica
Insects described in 1953